51 Squadron may refer to:

No. 51 Squadron RAF
No. 51 Squadron RAF Regiment
51 Squadron, Portuguese Air Force
HSM-51, United States Navy
VF-51, United States Navy